Aljaž Casar (born 17 September 2000) is a Slovenian footballer who plays as a midfielder for German club Hallescher FC.

References

External links
Aljaž Casar at NZS 

2000 births
Living people
People from Murska Sobota
Slovenian footballers
Slovenia under-21 international footballers
Association football midfielders
SC Rheindorf Altach players
TSG 1899 Hoffenheim II players
Hallescher FC players
Austrian Football Bundesliga players
Regionalliga players
3. Liga players
Slovenian expatriate footballers
Slovenian expatriate sportspeople in Austria
Expatriate footballers in Austria
Slovenian expatriate sportspeople in Germany
Expatriate footballers in Germany